Hugh Baker may refer to:

Hugh B. Baker (1882–1959), associate justice of the Rhode Island Supreme Court
Hugh P. Baker (1878–1950), American forester and educator
Hugh T. Baker (1906–1989), Irish cricketer
Hugh Cossart Baker Sr. (1818–1859), Canadian banker, businessman, mathematician
Hugh Cossart Baker Jr. (1846–1931), Canadian businessman, telephone pioneer